Emarat or Imarat or Amarat may refer to:
 Emarat, Ardabil
 Emarat, East Azerbaijan
 Emarat, Kazerun, Fars Province
 Emarat, Rostam, Fars Province
 Emarat, Ilam
 Amarat, Kermanshah
 Emarat, Kohgiluyeh and Boyer-Ahmad
 Emarat, Lorestan
 Emarat, Markazi
 Emarat, Esfarayen, North Khorasan
 Emarat, Jajrom, North Khorasan
 Emarat, Razavi Khorasan